Lophiotoma pseudocosmoi is a species of sea snail, a marine gastropod mollusk in the family Turridae, the turrids.

Description
The length of the shell attains 17 mm, its diameter 6.9 mm.

It is close in appearance to Gemmula cosmoi (Sykes, 1930), but differs by the peripheral carina and the height of its shell.

Distribution
This species occurs in the China Seas.

References

 Li B. [Baoquan] & Li X. [Xinzheng]. (2008). Report on the turrid genera Gemmula, Lophiotoma and Ptychosyrinx (Gastropoda: Turridae: Turrinae) from the China seas. Zootaxa. 1778: 1-25
 Liu, J.Y. [Ruiyu] (ed.). (2008). Checklist of marine biota of China seas. China Science Press. 1267 pp.

External links
 Biolib.cz: Lophiotoma pseudocosmoi

pseudocosmoi
Gastropods described in 2008